Medunjanin is a Bosnian surname. Notable people with the surname include:

Adis Medunjanin, Bosnian-American convicted terrorist and associate of Najibullah Zazi
Amira Medunjanin (born 1972), female singer from Bosnia and Herzegovina
Haris Medunjanin (born 1985), Bosnian professional footballer

Bosnian surnames
Slavic-language surnames